Parshvottanasana (Sanskrit: पार्श्वोत्तानासना, IAST: Pārśvottānāsana) or Intense Side Stretch Pose is a standing and forward bending asana in modern yoga as exercise.

Etymology and origins

The name of the pose is from the Sanskrit प्रसव (parshva) meaning "side",  ुत (ut) meaning "intense", तन (tan) meaning "to extend", and आस (asana), meaning "seat" or "pose".

The pose is unknown in medieval hatha yoga, but is described in Krishnamacharya's 1935 Yoga Makaranda, and taken up by his pupils Pattabhi Jois and B. K. S. Iyengar in their respective schools of yoga. A similar pose appears in Niels Bukh's 1924 Primary Gymnastics; Mark Singleton suggests that Krishnamacharya, influenced by the general gymnastics culture of the time, adopted gymnastics poses into his flowing style of yoga.

Description
The pose is entered from Tadasana. The hands are pressed palms together in prayer position behind the back, fingertips upwards. The feet are placed about a leg length apart, both legs remaining straight. The forward foot points directly forwards; the rear foot is turned forwards some 60 degrees. The hips are aligned at right angles to the feet, so that the body can move downwards in a forward bend straight over the front leg. The hands may be taken to the floor to intensify the stretch.

References

Sources

 
 
 
 

Standing asanas
Asymmetric asanas